Senator Sherwood may refer to:

Andrew Sherwood (politician) (born 1980), Arizona State Senate
Carl G. Sherwood (1855–1938), South Dakota State Senate
Franklin D. Sherwood (1841–1907), New York State Senate
Lyman Sherwood (1802–1865), New York State Senate